The Henty River is a perennial river in the West Coast region of Tasmania, Australia.

Location and features
Formed by the confluence of the Dobson and Newton Creeks, the river rises below Lake Newton on the western slopes of the Tyndall Range, northwest of Mount Tyndall, part of the West Coast Range of Tasmania.

The river flows generally south by west and then west, joined by eight tributaries.
 Bottle Creek
 Lost Creek
 Malcolm Creek
 McCutcheom's Creek
Tully
Yolande
Badger

The mouth emptying into the Southern Ocean at Henty Dunes.

The river descends  over its  course.

In the area known as the Upper Henty at the river's headwaters is the Henty Gold Mine. Its upper reaches were some of the last sites of dam making by the Hydro Tasmania in its long history of regulating flow of Tasmanian rivers.

The river catchment has two areas of high ground. One is known as the Professor Plateau, west of the Professor Range to the north of the river, and the other Misery Flat, which is high ground between the Tully River and Lost Creek.

The river basin is adjacent to the West Coast Range and the Lake Margaret areas, argued as having up to four separate periods of glaciation.

The river is crossed by bridges that carry the Zeehan-Strahan Road and the Zeehan Highway. A former bridge that carried the Strahan-Zeehan Railway, very close to the coast and Ocean Beach, has since been demolished.

Recreation uses
During October and November, the Henty River is a location for sea run trout.

Picnic spots are available beside the river at either the Strahan to Zeehan highway, or the Zeehan Highway.

See also

References

Further reading

External links 
 West Coast Council details

Rivers of Tasmania
West Coast Range